Highlands Today was a newspaper published in Sebring, Florida. It was associated with the Tampa Bay Times; Copies of the Times distributed in Highlands County, Florida included the supplement, which focuses on issues relevant to Sebring, Avon Park, Lake Placid, and other communities within the county.

The newspaper was previously associated with The Tampa Tribune until that paper was acquired by the Times Publishing Company, the publisher of the Times, in May 2016. After its acquisition, the Tribune was immediately folded and its associated newspapers, including Highlands Today, became publications of the Times.

On August 19, 2016, it was announced that the Tampa Bay Times sold Highlands Today to Sun Coast Media Group, owners of Highlands Today's competitor, the Highlands News-Sun.  Sun Coast Media Group absorbed Highlands Today's resources and merged it into its own paper, completing the process on Sept. 18, 2016, after Highlands Today published its final edition.

References

External links
 Highlands Today
 Highlands News-Sun

Defunct newspapers published in Florida
Times Publishing Company
Highlands County, Florida
2016 disestablishments in Florida
Publications disestablished in 2016